= 2015 Edo State House of Assembly election =

The 2015 Edo State House of Assembly election was held on April 11, 2015, to elect members of the Edo State House of Assembly in Nigeria. All the 24 seats were up for election in the Edo State House of Assembly.

== Results ==
=== Ovia North-East II ===
APC candidate Bright Osayande won the election.

2015 Edo State House of Assembly election
Party	Candidate	Votes	%
APC	Bright Osayande		
APC hold			

=== Ovia North-East I ===
APC candidate Sunday Osazimwede won the election.

2015 Edo State House of Assembly election
Party	Candidate	Votes	%
APC	Sunday Osazimwede		
APC hold			

=== Etsako East ===
APC candidate Kingsley Ugabi won the election.

2015 Edo State House of Assembly election
Party	Candidate	Votes	%
APC	Kingsley Ugabi		
APC hold			

=== Etsako Central ===
APC candidate Damian Lawani won the election.

2015 Edo State House of Assembly election
Party	Candidate	Votes	%
APC	Damian Lawani		
APC hold			

=== Etsako West II ===
APC candidate Yakubu Gowon Jerry won the election.

2015 Edo State House of Assembly election
Party	Candidate	Votes	%
APC	Yakubu Gowon Jerry		
APC hold			

=== Etsako West I ===
APC candidate Gani Audu won the election.

2015 Edo State House of Assembly election
Party	Candidate	Votes	%
APC	Gani Audu		
APC hold			

=== Oredo West ===
APC candidate Chris Okaeben won the election.

2015 Edo State House of Assembly election
Party	Candidate	Votes	%
APC	Chris Okaeben		
APC hold			

=== Oredo East ===
APC candidate Iyoha Osaigbovo won the election.

2015 Edo State House of Assembly election
Party	Candidate	Votes	%
APC	Iyoha Osaigbovo		
APC hold			

=== Ikpoba Okha ===
APC candidate Henry Okhuarobo won the election.

2015 Edo State House of Assembly election
Party	Candidate	Votes	%
APC	Henry Okhuarobo		
APC hold			

=== Egor ===
APC candidate Crosby Eribo won the election.

2015 Edo State House of Assembly election
Party	Candidate	Votes	%
APC	Crosby Eribo		
APC hold			

=== Uhunmwonde ===
APC candidate Elizabeth Aitivie won the election.

2015 Edo State House of Assembly election
Party	Candidate	Votes	%
APC	Elizabeth Aitivie		
APC hold			

=== Akoko-Edo I ===
APC candidate Kabir Adjoto won the election.

2015 Edo State House of Assembly election
Party	Candidate	Votes	%
APC	Kabir Adjoto		
APC hold			

=== Akoko-Edo II ===
APC candidate Emma Agbaje won the election.

2015 Edo State House of Assembly election
Party	Candidate	Votes	%
APC	Emma Agbaje		
APC hold			

=== Owan East ===
APC candidate Foly Ogedengbe won the election.

2015 Edo State House of Assembly election
Party	Candidate	Votes	%
APC	Foly Ogedengbe		
APC hold			

=== Owan West ===
APC candidate Asein Ojo won the election.

2015 Edo State House of Assembly election
Party	Candidate	Votes	%
APC	Asein Ojo		
APC hold			

=== Esan West ===
PDP candidate Monday Ehighalua won the election.

2015 Edo State House of Assembly election
Party	Candidate	Votes	%
PDP	Monday Ehighalua		
PDP hold			

=== Esan Central ===
APC candidate Victor Edoror won the election.

2015 Edo State House of Assembly election
Party	Candidate	Votes	%
APC	Victor Edoror		
APC hold			

=== Esan North-East I ===
PDP candidate Patrick Iluobe won the election.

2015 Edo State House of Assembly election
Party	Candidate	Votes	%
PDP	Patrick Iluobe		
PDP hold			

=== Esan North-East II ===
PDP candidate Ezehi Igban won the election.

2015 Edo State House of Assembly election
Party	Candidate	Votes	%
PDP	Ezehi Igban		
PDP hold			

=== Esan South East ===
APC candidate Festus Edughele won the election.

2015 Edo State House of Assembly election
Party	Candidate	Votes	%
APC	Festus Edughele		
APC hold			

=== Igueben ===
APC candidate Justin Okoloboh won the election.

2015 Edo State House of Assembly election
Party	Candidate	Votes	%
APC	Justin Okonoboh		
APC hold			

=== Orhionmwon II ===
APC candidate Asoro Osadebamwen Roland won the election.

2015 Edo State House of Assembly election
Party	Candidate	Votes	%
APC	Asoro Osadebamwen Roland		
APC hold			

=== Orhionmwon I ===
APC candidate Okunbor Nosayaba won the election.

2015 Edo State House of Assembly election
Party	Candidate	Votes	%
APC	Okunbor Nosayaba		
APC hold			

=== Ovia South-West ===
APC candidate Sunday Aghedo won the election.

2015 Edo State House of Assembly election
Party	Candidate	Votes	%
APC	Sunday Aghedo		
APC hold			
